Salim Ben Seghir (born 24 February 2003) is a Moroccan professional footballer who plays as a winger for Ligue 2 side Valenciennes, on loan from Ligue 1 club Marseille.

Club career

Nice 
Ben Seghir made his professional debut for Nice in a 3–1 Ligue 1 loss to Dijon on 29 November 2020, coming on as a late-match substitute.

Marseille 
On 22 June 2021, Ben Seghir signed a contract to join fellow Ligue 1 club Marseille.

International career
Ben Seghir is a youth international for France, having represented the country at under-17 level.

Personal life
Born in France, Ben Seghir is of Moroccan descent. He is the older brother of fellow footballer Eliesse Ben Seghir.

References

External links
 

2003 births
Living people
People from Saint-Tropez
French footballers
Association football wingers
France youth international footballers
French sportspeople of Moroccan descent
OGC Nice players
Olympique de Marseille players
Valenciennes FC players
Ligue 1 players

Championnat National 2 players
Championnat National 3 players
Sportspeople from Var (department)
Footballers from Provence-Alpes-Côte d'Azur